Chrome Web Store is Google's online store for its Chrome web browser. As of 2022, Chrome Web Store hosts about 123,000 extensions and 29,000 themes.

History
Chrome Web Store was publicly unveiled in December 2010, and was opened on February 11, 2011, with the release of Google Chrome 9.0. A year later it was redesigned to "catalyze a big increase in traffic, across downloads, users, and total number of apps". As of June 2012, there were 750 million total installs of content hosted on Chrome Web Store.

Some extension developers have sold their extensions to third-parties who then incorporated adware. In 2014, Google removed two such extensions from Chrome Web Store after many users complained about unwanted pop-up ads. The following year, Google acknowledged that about five percent of visits to its own websites had been altered by extensions with adware.

Malware

Malware remains a problem on Chrome Web Store. In January 2018, security researchers found four malicious extensions with more than 500,000 combined downloads. In February 2021, Google blocked "The Great Suspender", a popular extension with 2,000,000 users after it was reported that malicious code was added to it.

Chrome used to allow extensions hosted on Chrome Web Store to also be installed at the developer's website for the sake of convenience. But this became a malware vector, so it was removed in 2018.

References

External links
 

Google Chrome
Google services
Mobile software distribution platforms
Online marketplaces of the United States